Shanghai Noon is a 2000 martial arts western action comedy film starring Jackie Chan, Owen Wilson and Lucy Liu. The first in the Shanghai film series and marking the directorial debut of Tom Dey, Shanghai Noon was written by Alfred Gough and Miles Millar. The film received positive reviews and was a commercial success.

The film, set in Nevada and other parts of the American West in the 19th century, is a juxtaposition of a Western with a kung fu action film with extended martial arts sequences, as reflected by its title, which is a wordplay on the iconic western High Noon. It also has elements of comedy and the "Buddy cop film" genre, featuring two vastly different heroes (a Chinese Imperial Guard and an American Western outlaw) who team up to stop a crime. It is reminiscent of the iconic drama film of the genre from which it is largely inspired: Red Sun, with Charles Bronson (Wanted Cowboy) and Toshiro Mifune (Imperial Samuraï), but in the comedy register.

It was partially filmed in the Canadian Badlands, near Drumheller, Alberta, Canada, near Exshaw, Alberta, and also near Cochrane, Alberta.

A sequel, Shanghai Knights, was released in 2003, with David Dobkin as director.

Plot
In 1881, Chon Wang – a homophone for John Wayne – is a Chinese Imperial Guard in the Forbidden City. After Princess Pei-Pei, aided by her foreign tutor, runs away to the United States, the Emperor of China sends three of his guards and the Royal Interpreter to retrieve her. Having failed to stop her escape, Wang insists on joining the mission. The Royal Interpreter, Wang's uncle, allows him to accompany the party, and the Captain of the Imperial Guards hopes the "foreign devils" will get rid of Wang. The party arrives in Nevada, where outlaw Roy O'Bannon and his gang hijack their train. Wallace, a new member of Roy's gang, kills Wang's uncle, and Wang, a skilled martial artist, fights off the gang before uncoupling the train cars and escaping on the engine. Wallace takes over the gang, leaving Roy buried up to his chin in the desert. Meanwhile, Pei-Pei, tricked into believing she was freely escaping her arranged marriage in China, learns she has been kidnapped by an agent of Lo Fong, a traitor who fled the Forbidden City.

Wang finds Roy and demands to know the direction to Carson City. Roy tells him the city is on the other side of a mountain, and Wang leaves two chopsticks in Roy's mouth to dig himself out. Reaching the other side of the mountain, Wang saves a Sioux boy from the Crow tribe and half-consciously marries the Sioux chief's daughter, Falling Leaves, during the wild celebrations. Wang finds a small town and encounters Roy in a tavern, inciting a barroom brawl. The two are sent to jail, and share each other's stories. Tempted by mention of the gold ransom, Roy offers to help Wang find the princess. After Falling Leaves helps them escape, Roy trains Wang in the ways of the cowboy, assisted by Falling Leaves.
 
In Carson City, Roy discovers that both he and Wang are wanted by Lo Fong's ally Marshal Nathan Van Cleef, narrowly escaping capture. They reach Roy’s "hideout" (a bordello), and bond with each other while recuperating there. They are arrested by Van Cleef after a drunken encounter with Wang, and discover that Lo Fong is behind the princess’ abduction. As they are about to be hanged, Wang frees himself, Falling Leaves shoots Roy loose, and they escape. Wang, upset at overhearing Roy tell a prostitute he is not Wang's friend, rides off alone. He finds Pei-Pei in Lo Fong's labor camp, but she wishes to stay and help the enslaved Chinese laborers. Lo Fong discovers Wang and attacks him, but Roy appears, saving Wang.

The next day, the Imperial Guards bring gold to the Carson City Mission church to ransom Pei-Pei from Lo Fong, but the exchange is complicated by the appearance of Wang and Roy. Wang tells his fellow guards he will not allow them to take the princess against her wishes. As the guards and Lo Fong fight, Van Cleef arrives and engages Roy in a gunfight. Roy survives unscathed, and shoots Van Cleef through his sheriff's star, killing him. Wang fights the Imperial Guards as Lo Fong chases Pei-Pei through the rafters of the church, but Wang convinces his guards to let him go to Pei-Pei’s aid instead. Wang and Lo Fong reach the bell tower, and Pei-Pei is wounded. Wang dismantles the bell, causing the ropes to strangle Lo Fong to death. The Imperial Guards agree to let Pei-Pei remain in Nevada, and reward Wang and Roy with the ransom gold.

Wallace and his gang arrive at the church, and demand that Roy and Wang come out and fight, but find themselves surrounded by the Sioux. At a Chinese cultural celebration, Roy shares a passionate kiss with Falling Leaves while Pei-Pei embraces Wang. Wang and Roy, who reveals his real name to be Wyatt Earp, become sheriffs and ride off after a new band of train robbers.

Cast

Reception

Box office
Produced at a budget of $55 million, the film grossed $99,274,467. The film opened in third place at the North American box office grossing USD$19.6 million in its opening weekend behind Dinosaur and Mission: Impossible 2.

Critical response
Shanghai Noon was well received by critics.

On Rotten Tomatoes the film has an approval rating of 80% "certified fresh", based on 135 reviews with an average rating of 6.6/10. The site's consensus reads: "Although the plot is really nothing to brag about, Jackie Chan and Owen Wilson work well together. The cinematography looks great, and Jackie delivers a hilarious performance. This is an old-fashioned crowd-pleaser."

On Metacritic it has a score of 77 out of 100 based on 30 reviews. Audiences surveyed by CinemaScore gave the film a grade "A−" on scale of A to F.

Joe Leydon of Variety gave Shanghai Noon a favorable review, characterizing it as "Fast, furious and, quite often, very, very funny." Roger Ebert of the Chicago Sun-Times wrote: "If you see only one martial arts Western this year (and there is probably an excellent chance of that), this is the one."

Sequel
A sequel, Shanghai Knights, was released on February 7, 2003.

See also
 The Fighting Fist of Shanghai Joe
 Red Sun
 The Stranger and the Gunfighter
 Jackie Chan filmography
 List of martial arts films

Notes

References

External links

 
 
 
 

2000 films
2000 action comedy films
2000 comedy films
2000 directorial debut films
2000 martial arts films
2000s Western (genre) comedy films
2000s buddy comedy films
2000s martial arts comedy films
American Western (genre) comedy films
American action comedy films
American buddy comedy films
Action films about Asian Americans
Comedy films about Asian Americans
Films about Chinese Americans
Films directed by Tom Dey
Films produced by Roger Birnbaum
Films scored by Randy Edelman
Films set in Alberta
Films set in Beijing
Films set in Nevada
Films set in the 1880s
Films set in the Qing dynasty
Films set in 19th-century Qing dynasty
Kung fu films
2000s Mandarin-language films
Shanghai (film series)
Spyglass Entertainment films
Touchstone Pictures films
2000s English-language films
2000s American films